The Fairey Prince may refer to:

 Fairey Prince (H-16), a British experimental 16-cylinder H-type aircraft engine
 Fairey Prince (V-12), a British experimental V-12 aircraft engine